Cheng-Chih Wu is currently the president of the National Taiwan Normal University, and was the director of the Graduate Institute of Information and Computer Education at NTNU.

During his deanship at NTNU, he has put through many reforms, including abolishing the rule of expelling students who fail more than half of the registered courses. Wu once said, “students should be responsible for their own education, while we should give them a second chance instead of depriving them of their right to education with this rule.”

Wu’s expertise includes designing computer courses and teaching materials, teaching with information technology, and mobile learning.

Education

 Science Education (Computer Science Education), The University of Texas at Austin, U.S., Ph.D.
 Industrial Education, NTNU, Taiwan (M.Ed.)
 Industrial Education, NTNU, Taiwan (B. Ed.)

Positions

2013–2017	Vice President, NTNU
2010-2013	Dean, Office of Academic Affairs, NTNU
2008-2010	Director, Information Technology Center, NTNU
2005-2006	Visiting Scholar, Faculty of Education, University of Cambridge
1999-2001	Chairman, the Department of Information and Computer Education, NTNU

Sports
 President of National Taiwan Normal University Football Team

References

Living people
National Taiwan Normal University alumni
Academic staff of the National Taiwan Normal University
University of Texas at Austin alumni
Year of birth missing (living people)